List of the National Register of Historic Places listings in Rhinebeck, New York

This is intended to be a complete list of properties and districts listed (and one formerly listed) on the National Register of Historic Places in the town and village of Rhinebeck, New York, including in the hamlet of Rhinecliff.  The locations of National Register properties and districts (at least for all showing latitude and longitude coordinates below) may be seen in an online map by clicking on "Map of all coordinates".



Listed on the National Register

|--
|}

Former listings

|}

See also

National Register of Historic Places listings in Dutchess County, New York
National Register of Historic Places listings in New York

References

Rhinebeck
Buildings and structures in Rhinebeck, New York